Daburiyya, also Deburieh or Dabburieh, is an Arab local council around  east of Nazareth in Israel's Northern District. Daburriya gained local council status in 1961. Its jurisdiction extends over 7,200 dunams.

Daburiyya is located off of Highway 65 at the foot of Mount Tabor in the Lower Galilee, near the area where the prophetess Deborah judged.

History

Ancient period 

Classical period 
During the Hellenistic and Roman periods, the Greek name of the place was Dabráth or Dabiroth and its Latin name was Dabareth. Josephus called it Dabarittha (Greek: Δαβαρίθθων, "Dabarithon").

In the early 4th-century CE Onomasticon, Eusebius refers to it as Dabeira and Dabrath and describes it as "a village of Jews".

Daburiyya has been identified by some with the locality of Helenopolis of the Roman-Byzantine period, but Helenopolis is more commonly identified with Kafr Kama or another town or region.

Crusaders
After being part of the Crusader Kingdom of Jerusalem, Daburiyya fell to Saladin in 1187 and a mosque, possibly built above an old Crusader tower, has an inscription above the entrance stating that it was built in AH 610 (1214 CE) by the Damascus-based Ayyubid ruler al-Mu'azzam 'Isa. What was interpreted as remains of a Crusader church could still be seen in the 18th century in the center of Daburiyya.

Ottoman Empire
In 1517, the village was incorporated into the Ottoman Empire with the rest of Palestine, and in 1596 Dabburiya appeared in the Ottoman tax registers as being in the nahiya (subdistrict) of Tabariyya under Safad Sanjak, with a population of 40 households and 3 bachelors, all Muslim. They paid a fixed tax rate of 25% on agricultural products, including wheat and barley, fruit trees, cotton, as well as on goats and/or beehives; a total of 5,500 akçe.

A map from Napoleon's invasion of 1799 by Pierre Jacotin showed the place, named as Dabouri.

In 1838, it was noted as a Muslim village in the Nazareth district. It was found "small and unimportant", with the visible ruins of a Christian church.

Victor Guérin visited in the 1875, and noted "Among the houses may be remarked the remains of an ancient edifice, measuring twenty-two paces in length by ten in breadth, and built from west to east.It was once constructed of cut stones and a certain number of courses are still standing. The interior is now occupied by a private house and a stable, above which rises the medafeh—a house set apart for strangers. In all probability this was a Christian Church."

In 1881, the PEF's Survey of Western Palestine (SWP) described Deburieh as "A small village built of stone, with inhabited caves; contains about 200 Moslems and is surrounded by gardens of figs and olives. It is situated on the slope of the hill. Water is obtained from cisterns in the village."

A population list from about 1887 showed that ed Deburieh had about 300 inhabitants; all Muslims.

British Mandate
In the 1922 census of Palestine, conducted by the British Mandate authorities, Dabburieh had a total population of 602, all Muslim, which had increased in the 1931 census to 747; 728 Muslims and 19 Christians, in a total of 170 houses.

In the 1945 statistics the population was 1,290, 1,260 Muslims and 30 Christians, with 13,373 dunams of land, according to an official land and population survey. Of this, 723 dunams were for plantations and irrigable land, 12,581 for cereals, while 65 dunams were built-up land.

Archaeology
Minor archaeological surveys, salvage and trial digs conducted in the village, including some in 2004 and 2006, uncovered pottery and other fragmentary remains from the Iron Age to the Ottoman period. The 2000s digs brought to light ceramic from the Iron Age, Hellenistic, Roman, Byzantine, Umayyad and Mamluk periods, sparse building remains from the Late Roman or Byzantine period, and a probable terrace wall datable to the Middle Bronze Age and/or the Roman period, as well as rock-cut installations such as winepresses and cupmarks.

Education
In 2008 and 2009 Daburiyya High School received the National Education Award, achieving second and third place. It was the first time that a school in Israel has won the award twice in a row. The principal, Abed Elsalam Masalcha, attributed the positive developments in the school to the introduction of a Transcendental Meditation program which solved student discipline problems.

In 2009 the Israeli Education Ministry said it would shut down the town's high school of sciences, which had 210 students that year, because it was operating without a permit. The school, located in a building intended for a housing project, specialized in biology, physics, chemistry and computer science and had a 100% matriculation success rate. It was a branch of the I'billin-based Mar Elias School. According to the local parents' association, the school was opened because the local high school had become "chaotic and the police needed to frequently intervene between students."

See also
 Arab localities in Israel

References

Bibliography

 p 366

 

 

 (p. 427)
 
 

 
 

 

 

 

 
 (p. 44)

External links
Welcome To Dabburiya
Survey of Western Palestine, Map 6:  IAA, Wikimedia commons 
Finds from a Burial Cave at Daburriya 
Israeli-Arab lifestyle change may create old-age home boom

 

Arab localities in Israel
Local councils in Northern District (Israel)
Ancient Jewish settlements of Galilee
Mount Tabor